Sado Airport  is a public aerodrome located in Sado, Niigata Prefecture, Japan.

History
Service to and from Sado Airport has been indefinitely suspended since April 2014. New Japan Aviation provided scheduled service until the airport's closure, although other scheduled operators have served the airport in the past. Kyokushin Air operated the Sado-Niigata route until September 2008.

In November 2015, Sado Airport announced it would lengthen the runway to 2,000 meters from December 2015 to handle jet service with additional destination to Tokyo-Haneda and Osaka-Itami.

References

Airports in Japan
Transport in Niigata Prefecture
Buildings and structures in Niigata Prefecture